Black Bishop may refer to:

Black bishop, a chess piece
Black bishop (Euplectes gierowii), a species of passerine bird native to Africa
Black Bishop, the alias of the Marvel Comics character Harry Leland

See also
James Black (bishop), was the first Roman Catholic Bishop of Paisley, Scotland